A penumbral lunar eclipse took place on 14 March 2006, the first of two lunar eclipses in 2006.

This was a relatively rare total penumbral lunar eclipse with the moon passing entirely within the penumbral shadow without entering the darker umbral shadow. The tables below contain detailed predictions and additional information on the Penumbral Lunar Eclipse of 14 March 2006.

Visibility 

It was completely visible over Africa and Europe, seen rising over eastern North America, all of South America, and setting over western Asia.

A simulated view of the earth from the center of the moon at maximum eclipse.

Map

Relation to other lunar eclipses

Eclipses of 2006 
 A penumbral lunar eclipse on 14 March.
 A total solar eclipse on 29 March.
 A partial lunar eclipse on 7 September.
 An annular solar eclipse on 22 September.

Lunar year series (354 days)

Saros series 
The eclipse belongs to Saros series 113, and is the 63rd of 71 lunar eclipses in the series. The first penumbral eclipse of saros cycle 113 began on 29 April 888 AD, first partial eclipse on 14 July 1014, and total first was on 20 March 1429. The last total eclipse occurred on 7 August 1645, last partial on 21 February 1970, and last penumbral eclipse on 10 June 2150.

Half-Saros cycle
A lunar eclipse will be preceded and followed by solar eclipses by 9 years and 5.5 days (a half saros). This lunar eclipse is related to two total solar eclipses of Solar Saros 120.

Metonic cycles (19 years)

Eclipse season 

This is the first eclipse this season.

Second eclipse this season: 29 March 2006 Total Solar Eclipse

See also 
List of lunar eclipses and List of 21st-century lunar eclipses
May 2003 lunar eclipse
November 2003 lunar eclipse
May 2004 lunar eclipse
 :File:2006-03-14 Lunar Eclipse Sketch.gif Chart

Notes

External links
 
 photo of partial [penumbral] eclipse on March 14th of 2006, Kennebunk, Maine

2006-03
2006-03
2006 in science
March 2006 events